Lower Brandywine Presbyterian Church is a congregation of the Presbyterian Church (USA) in New Castle County, Delaware.

History 
Lower Brandywine Presbyterian Church was organized on October 15, 1720, as part of a greater trend of growth of Presbyterianism in northern Delaware. In 1773 the original congregation split into two distinct churches, after which a log church was built to accommodate the Delaware congregation. This church was used until 1860, when the current brick church was constructed at its present site. The steeple was added in 1929. The current church was renovated in 1992, and again in 2007.

Cemetery 
The church grounds encompass a 10-acre cemetery.

Pollinator garden 
In 2017 the church established a pollinator garden on its property.

References 

Churches completed in 1860
Churches in New Castle County, Delaware
Presbyterian churches in Delaware
1860s establishments in Delaware